The name Jesus College Boat Club may refer to at least two rowing clubs, including:

Jesus College Boat Club (Cambridge)
Jesus College Boat Club (Oxford)